Ron Keel (born March 25, 1961) is an American rock singer. He is known as the singer for Ron Keel Band, Keel, Steeler, and Saber Tiger, and has also fronted IronHorse, Fair Game, and The Rat'lers, in addition to being a solo artist. He is also an author, radio show host, actor and owner/manager of RFK Media LLC.

Biography 
Ron Keel began his recording career with a Tennessee-based band named Lust. He relocated his next Nashville band Steeler to Los Angeles in 1981 and became a top draw on the Southern California scene. In 1983 Steeler signed with Shrapnel Records and released their self-titled album which also featured Yngwie Malmsteen, Rik Fox and Mark Edwards.

In 1984, he was briefly the lead singer of Black Sabbath. He recorded some demos with the band, but soon parted ways when the band had a falling out with producer Spencer Proffer over creative differences.

Following Steeler, Keel formed a new band and simply called it Keel. The band secured a record deal with Gold Mountain/A&M Records. From 1984 to 1989, Keel toured the world and sold 2 million records. KISS vocalist/bassist Gene Simmons produced two of Keel's albums: The Right to Rock and The Final Frontier. Both charted on Billboard's Hot 100, as did their third self-titled major label album on MCA Records which was produced by Michael Wagener. In 1987, their cover of "Rock N Roll Outlaw" was featured in the movie "Dudes." A sixth album Back In Action (1998) consisted of unreleased demos; the band reunited in 2008 and toured to celebrate their 25th anniversary.

In 1990, Ron Keel formed the band Fair Game, a project Keel fronted with four female backup musicians.  Two of the songs recorded by the band were featured on the soundtrack to the movie Bad Channels. Their complete recording sessions finally emerged in 2000 on the Metal Mayhem label billed as Beauty & The Beast.

For most of the 90s Ron Keel, rebranded as Ronnie Lee Keel, toured and recorded as a country music artist, releasing a solo album "Western Country" in 1995. He returned to Nashville to front The Rat'lers, who released one album "Thick As Thieves" and toured US military bases throughout Europe. As a country songwriter, Keel's compositions have appeared in dozens of major films and television shows such as X-Files and King Of The Hill.

Ron Keel returned to the heavy metal music scene in 1997, when he collaborated with Japanese guitarist Akihito Kinoshita on Project One, the major label debut album from Kinoshita's band Saber Tiger.

In 2000, Ron Keel formed IronHorse, which mixed country with southern rock. He left the band in 2007 to focus on other aspects of his career. He established himself in Las Vegas as a country tribute artist, creating and starring in Country Superstars Tribute, portraying Ronnie Dunn in the long-running live show at the Fitz Casino & Hotel in Las Vegas, Nevada as well as a two year run at the Golden Nugget.

In 2008. prior to reforming his band Keel, Ron Keel formed a band named K2. K2 featured himself on vocals and guitar, and performed many of the songs from his earlier career.

In 2012, Keel launched his syndicated radio show Streets Of Rock N Roll on multiple FM/AM/online radio stations worldwide. The show ran for two years until Keel relocated to Sioux Falls, South Dakota, to become the midday host on the hard rock radio station KBAD-FM and front man for the Badlands House Band, at Badlands Pawn, Gold, and Jewelry. Although Keel and KBAD enjoyed excellent market ratings, on September 23, 2017, KBAD ceased operations due to financial and legal issues related to other business ventures that KBAD station owner, Chuck Brennan, was enduring at the time. In 2019 Keel relaunched his syndicated radio show which continues to feature interviews with rock stars and industry insiders on stations worldwide.

In 2014, Keel published his autobiography Even Keel: Life On The Streets Of Rock N Roll (Wild West Media). This coincided with the release of his first rock solo album "Metal Cowboy."

In 2017, Badlands House Band was renamed Ron Keel Band, retaining the same band members. Their debut album "Fight Like A Band" was released in 2019 on EMP Label Group, and followed in 2020 with "South X South Dakota," an album of southern rock covers, on HighVol Music. Ron Keel Band has opened shows for Tesla, Night Ranger, Dwight Yoakam, RATT, Warrant, and Sawyer Brown as well as headlining major biker events, casinos, fairs, clubs and festivals.

Ron Keel's 2019/2020 World Tour included the Monsters Of Rock Cruise (Belize/Cozumel), Ron's first-ever tour of Australia, the Frontiers Rock Festival in Milan, Italy, the KISS & Rock N Roll Expo in Helsinki, Finland, casinos, fairs and festivals stateside, KEELFEST (featuring Keel, Ron Keel Band and Steeler) in Columbus, Ohio plus major bike events like the Sturgis Rally and Hot Harley Nights. He continues to perform worldwide with Ron Keel Band and as an acoustic solo artist.

In 2022, Ron Keel launched RFK Media LLC, a record label/multi-media company releasing his new albums and working with other artists. The first release from RFK Media was "Keeled," an EP of 80's Keel songs re-recorded by Ron Keel Band. That was followed in June 2022 with the Ron Keel Band single "When This Is Over."

Discography

Steeler 
Steeler (1983)
Come Hell or Hollywood...1981-82 (2020)

Keel 
Lay Down the Law (1984)
The Right to Rock (1985)
The Final Frontier (1986)
Keel (1987)
Larger Than Live (1989)
Keel VI: Back in Action (1998)
Streets of Rock & Roll (2010)

Fair Game 
Beauty and the Beast (1991)

IronHorse 
IronHorse (2001)
Bring It On (2004)

Ron Keel Band 
Fight Like a Band (2019)
South X South Dakota (2020)
Keeled (2022)

Solo albums 
Western Country (1995)
Alone at Last (2006)
Metal Cowboy (2014)
Metal Cowboy: RELOADED (2018)
Tribute albums
Lick It Up: A Millennium Tribute to KISS ("Lick It Up" ) (2008)
Double Talkin' Jive: A Hard Rock Tribute to Guns N Roses ("Don't Cry") (2008)
A World With Heroes: a KISS Tribute for Cancer Care ("Rock N Roll Hell") (2013)
Movie soundtracks

 Dudes ("Rock N Roll Outlaw") (1987)
 Bad Channels ("Blind Faith," "Somewhere In The Night") (1992)
 Men in Black II ("Speed Demon") (2002)

Guest appearances

 Black N Blue: In Heat (guest vocals on "Best In The West") (1988)
 House of Lords: Sahara (backing vocals on "Chains Of Love") (1988)
 Sin City Sinners: Dive Bar Days Revisited (duet with Frank Dimino on "Tie Your Mother Down") (2015)
 Sin City Sinners: A Sinner's Christmas (lead vocal on "Silent Night") (2011)
 Rock 4Xmas: (vocal trio on title track) (2004)
 Steve Purcell: Ample'tudes (lead vocal on "Angel In Hell") (2020)

DVD

 The Ultimate Video Collection (DVD, 2007)

References

External links 
 Official website

1961 births
Living people
American heavy metal guitarists
American heavy metal singers
20th-century American guitarists
Steeler (American band) members
Keel (band) members
Black Sabbath members